Ferdinand Gottlieb von Gmelin (10 March 1782 in Tübingen – 21 December 1848 in Tübingen) was a German physician. He was a nephew of  botanist Samuel Gottlieb Gmelin (1744–1784).

In 1802 he received his medical doctorate from the University of Tübingen, then following graduation, took a study trip through Germany, Italy and France. In 1805 he became an associate professor, and from 1810 onward, was a full professor of natural sciences and medicine at Tübingen. In 1823 he was awarded the Knight's Cross of the Order of the Württemberg Crown.

Selected works 
 Allgemeine Pathologie des menschlichen Körpers, 1813 – General pathology of the human body.
 Allgemeine Therapie der Krankheiten des Menschen, 1830 – General therapy of human diseases.
 Die ostindische Cholera (translation of John Mason Good; 1831) – East Indian cholera. 
 Critik der Principien der Homöopathie, 1835 – Critique of the principles of homeopathy (considered to be his best work).

References 

1782 births
1848 deaths
People from Tübingen
University of Tübingen alumni
Academic staff of the University of Tübingen
19th-century German physicians